Adolf Fyodorovich Poskotin (11 July 1937, in Ivanovo – 31 January 2015) was a Russian professional football player and coach.

External links
 

1937 births
Sportspeople from Ivanovo
2015 deaths
Soviet footballers
Soviet football managers
SC Tavriya Simferopol players
FC Metalist Kharkiv players
Russian football managers
FC Metalist Kharkiv managers
FC Kryvbas Kryvyi Rih managers
FC Kuban Krasnodar managers
Association football defenders
FC Tekstilshchik Ivanovo players